The Segunda División B 2006–07 season was the 30th since its establishment. The first matches of the season were played on 27 August 2006, and the season ended on 24 June 2007 with the promotion play-off finals.

Group 1
Teams of Madrid, Galicia, Balearic Islands, Canary Islands and Melilla.

Scores and Classification - Group 1

Liguilla de Ascenso:
 Universidad de Las Palmas - Eliminated in First Round.
 Pontevedra - Eliminated in First Round.
 Las Palmas - Promoted to Segunda División
 Vecindario - Promoted to Segunda División

Promoted to this group from Tercera División:
 Gimnástica - Founded in: 1907//, Based in: Torrelavega, Cantabria//, Promoted From: Group 3
 CD Cobeña - Founded in: 1998//, Based in: Cobeña, Community of Madrid//, Promoted From: Group 7
 CD Orientación Marítima - Founded in: 1954//, Based in: Arrecife, Canary Islands//, Promoted From: Group 12
 CD Lugo - Founded in: 1953//, Based in: Lugo, Galicia//, Promoted From: Group 1
 Puertollano - Founded in: 1948//, Based in: Puertollano, Castile-La Mancha//, Promoted From: Group 17

Relegated to this group from Segunda División:
 Racing de Ferrol - Founded in: 1919//, Based in: Ferrol, Galicia//, Relegated From: Segunda División

Relegated to Tercera División:
 Alcalá - Founded in: 1929//, Based in: Alcalá de Henares, Madrid//, Relegated to: Group 7
 San Isidro - Founded in: 1970//, Based in: San Isidro, Canary Islands//, Relegated to: Group 12
 Móstoles - Founded in: 1955//, Based in: Móstoles, Madrid//, Relegated to: Group 7
 Negreira - Founded in: 1965//, Based in: Negreira, Galicia//, Relegated to: Group 1
 Castillo - Founded in: 1950//, Based in: Castillo del Romeral, Canary Islands//, Relegated to: Group 12

Teams

League table

Results

Top goalscorers

Top goalkeepers

Group 2
Teams of Basque Country, Castile and León, Cantabria and Asturias.

Scores and Classification - Group 2

Liguilla de Ascenso:
 Salamanca - Promoted to Segunda División
 Real Sociedad B - Eliminated in First Round
 Burgos - Eliminated in First Round
 Ponferradina - Promoted to Segunda División

Promoted to this group from Tercera División:
 Universidad de Oviedo - Founded in: 1962//, Based in: Oviedo, Asturias//, Promoted From: Group 2
 Sestao - Founded in: 1996//, Based in: Sestao, Basque Country//, Promoted From: Group 4
 Guijuelo - Founded in: 1974//, Based in: Guijuelo, Castile and León//, Promoted From: Group 8
 Logroñés - Founded in: 1940//, Based in: Logroño, La Rioja//, Promoted From: Group 15-LR

Relegated to this group from Segunda División:
 Eibar - Founded in: 1940//, Based in: Eibar, Basque Country//, Relegated From: Segunda División

Relegated to Tercera División:
 SCD Durango - Founded in: 1919//, Based in: Durango, Basque Country//, Relegated to: Group 4
 Alaves B - Founded in: 1921//, Based in: Vitoria-Gasteiz, Basque Country//, Relegated to: Group 4
 Portugalete - Founded in: 1944//, Based in: Portugalete, Basque Country//, Relegated to: Group 4
 Zalla - Founded in: 1925//, Based in: Zalla, Basque Country//, Relegated to: Group 4

Teams

League table

Results

Top goalscorers

Top goalkeepers

Group 3
Teams of Catalonia, Navarre, Valencian Community and Aragon.

Scores and Classification - Group 3

Liguilla de Ascenso:
 Badalona - Eliminated in First Round
 Levante B - Eliminated in Second Round
 Alicante - Eliminated in Second Round
 Gramanet - Eliminated in First Round

Promoted to this group from Tercera División:
 Valencia B - Founded in: 1944//, Based in: Paterna, Valencian Community//, Promoted From: Group 6
 Espanyol B - Founded in: 1981//, Based in: Barcelona, Catalonia//, Promoted From: Group 5
 Orihuela - Founded in: 1993//, Based in: Orihuela, Valencian Community//, Promoted From: Group 6
 Eldense - Founded in: 1921//, Based in: Elda, Valencian Community//, Promoted From: Group 6
 Barbastro - Founded in: 1934//, Based in: Barbastro, Aragon//, Promoted From: Group 16

Relegated to this group from Segunda División:
 Lleida - Founded in: 1939//, Based in: Lleida, Catalonia//, Relegated From: Segunda División

Relegated to Tercera División:
 Reus - Founded in: 1909//, Based in: Reus, Catalonia//, Relegated to: Group 5
 Sabadell - Founded in: 1903//, Based in: Sabadell, Catalonia//, Relegated to: Group 5
 Zaragoza B - Founded in: 1965//, Based in: Zaragoza, Aragon//, Relegated to: Group 16
 Peralta - Founded in: 1908//, Based in: Peralta, Navarre//, Relegated to: Group 15-N

Teams

League table

Results

Top goalscorers

Top goalkeepers

Group 4
Teams of Andalusia, Extremadura, Castile La Mancha, Ceuta and Murcia.

Scores and Classification - Group 4

Liguilla de Ascenso:
 Cartagena - Eliminated in First Round
 Aguilas - Eliminated in First Round
 Linares - Eliminated in Second Round
 Sevilla Atlético Club - Eliminated in Second Round

Promoted to this group from Tercera División:
 Portuense - Founded in: 1928//, Based in: El Puerto de Santa María, Andalusia//, Promoted From: Group 10
 Villanovense - Founded in: 1992//, Based in: Villanueva de la Serena, Extremadura//, Promoted From: Group 14
 Granada - Founded in: 1931//, Based in: Granada, Andalusia//, Promoted From: Group 9
 Cerro Reyes - Founded in: 1979//, Based in: Badajoz, Extremadura//, Promoted From: Group 14

Relegated to this group from Segunda División:
 Málaga B - Founded in: 1990//, Based in: Málaga, Andalusia//, Relegated From: Segunda División

Relegated to Tercera División:
 Almansa - Founded in: 1992//, Based in: Almansa, Castile-La Mancha//, Relegated to: Group 17
 Conquense - Founded in: 1946//, Based in: Cuenca, Castile-La Mancha//, Relegated to: Group 17
 Algeciras - Founded in: 1912//, Based in: Algeciras, Andalusia//, Relegated to: Group 10
 Díter Zafra - Founded in: 1930//, Based in: Zafra, Extremadura//, Relegated to: Group 14
 CD Badajoz - Founded in: 1905//, Based in: Badajoz, Extremadura//, Relegated to: Group 14

Teams

League table

Results

Top goalscorers

Top goalkeepers

References 

 
Segunda División B seasons

3
Spain